Sir Christopher William Kelly, KCB (born 18 August 1946) is a former senior British Civil Servant who was the Chairman of the Committee on Standards in Public Life and Chairman of the NSPCC.

Early life
Born in Bromley, Kent, Kelly is the son of Dr. Reginald Kelly (1917–90), a former President of the Association of British Neurologists. He attended the independent Beaumont College. He studied Economics at Trinity College, Cambridge and the University of Manchester.

Civil Service career
His first senior appointment in the Civil Service started when he was appointed Private Secretary to the Financial Secretary in 1971, a post he held until 1973. From 1978 to 1980 he was Secretary to the Wilson Committee of Inquiry into Financial Institutions. He held various other appointments in the Civil Service, including Director of Fiscal & Monetary Policy (1994–95). He was the Head of Policy Group in the Department of Social Security from 1995 to 1997. 

He was the Permanent Secretary to the Department of Health from 1997 to 2000, while Frank Dobson and later Alan Milburn were the Secretary of State.

Post Civil Service career
A report written by him, and published in July 2004, looked into the agencies which dealt with Soham murderer  Ian Huntley and why 'alarm bells' did not ring sooner that he should not be allowed to work with children. 

Sir Christopher Kelly became the Chairman of the NSPCC in 2002, and in January 2005 became Chairman of the Financial Ombudsman Service, serving until January 2012. 

On 5 December 2007, Kelly was chosen by the British Prime Minister Gordon Brown to become the Chairman of the Committee on Standards in Public Life.

In October 2010 he was appointed chairman of the King's Fund.

In December 2012 he was appointed chairman of the Responsible Gambling Strategy Board (RGSB), starting in April 2013.
He is a Non-executive member and chairs the Oversight Board of the Office of Budget Responsibility. He is a senior independent non-executive director on the board of the Co-op Group, chairing the board of the insurance group, and is a member of the Advisory Board to the Institute of Business Ethics.

Recognition
In 2001, he was created a Knight Commander of the Order of the Bath.

Personal life
He married Alison Durant in 1970 in St Marylebone, and they have two sons and a daughter. He lives in north London.

References

External links
 Appointment as Chairman of the Financial Ombudsman Service
 The Kelly Review

1946 births
Living people
Permanent Under-Secretaries of State for Health
British civil servants
Civil servants in HM Treasury
Civil servants in the Department of Social Security
Knights Commander of the Order of the Bath
People from Bromley
Alumni of London Business School
Alumni of Trinity College, Cambridge
Alumni of the University of Manchester
National Society for the Prevention of Cruelty to Children people
Member of the Committee on Standards in Public Life